Toronto, Ontario, Canada has a significant film and television production industry, which has earned it the nickname "Hollywood North", alongside Vancouver, British Columbia. In addition to features that take place in Toronto, it often serves as a substitute location for other cities and areas including Chicago and New York City.

Neighbourhoods

Cabbagetown
Big Fat Greek Wedding
Serendipity (film)

Buildings

Casa Loma
X-Men
X2
Scott Pilgrim vs. the World

Fairmont Royal York
Cinderella Man

Toronto City Hall
Resident Evil: Apocalypse
Star Trek: The Next Generation
The Sentinel

Toronto Reference Library
Red (also Chicago, Illinois and New York City, New York)

University of Toronto
Mean Girls
Chicago
Capote
Man of the Year
Skulls
Hannibal (TV series)
Nikita (TV series)
Orphan Black
The Incredible Hulk (film)
Urban Legend (film)
Harold and Kumar Go To White Castle (2004 film)
The Boondock Saints (1999 film)
Designated Survivor
Suits
Mrs. America
Salvation

University of Toronto Scarborough
Total Recall
Shadowhunters

Parks

Morningside Park
The Incredible Hulk

Allan Gardens
Warehouse 13
Rookie Blue

Guild Park and Gardens
The Skulls (film)

Streets

Church Street
Kojak
The Grid
Queer As Folk (US)
Saving Hope

Kingston Road
Kick-Ass

Yonge Street
Confessions of a Teenage Drama Queen
Queer as Folk (US)
Suicide Squad

Elizabeth Street
Pacific Rim (film)

Studios

District 28
[[Formerly: Hangloose Media]]

References